The Men's Downhill competition of the 1980 Winter Olympics at Lake Placid was held at Whiteface Mountain on Thursday, 

The defending world champion was Josef Walcher of Austria, while Switzerland's Peter Müller was the defending World Cup downhill champion and led the 1980 World Cup.
Defending Olympic champion Franz Klammer did not compete; he was not selected to the Austrian Olympic team in 1980.

Gold medalist Leonhard Stock was an alternate on the Austrian downhill team, at the Olympics for the slalom. His fast training times earned him a spot on the four-man team, displacing Walcher, the reigning world champion. All four Austrians in the race finished in the top ten and Müller was fourth.

Results
The race was started at 11:30 local time, (UTC −5).

Source:

References

External links
FIS results

1980
Men's alpine skiing at the 1980 Winter Olympics
Winter Olympics